Ines Pellegrini (born on 7 November 1954) is an Italian retired actress of Eritrean origin.

Life and career 
Though born in Milan, Pelligrini spent her childhood in Eritrea, attending Italian schools, before returning to Italy with her adoptive father in the 1970s. She made her film debut in 1973 in Il brigadiere Pasquale Zagaria ama la mamma e la polizia but her career was launched by Pier Paolo Pasolini, who chose her for the role of Zumurrud in Arabian Nights (1974); she also appeared in Pasolini's last film, Salò, or the 120 Days of Sodom (1975).

About her Pasolini wrote: "When I noticed a half-caste Eritrean-Italian, I almost cried looking at her small, somewhat irregular features, perfect as those of a metal statue, hearing her chirpy, interrogatory Italian, and seeing those eyes, lost in a pleading uncertainty."

Later Pellegrini became a minor starlet in Italian films including Eyeball (1975), La madama (1976), Blue Belle (1976), Una bella governante di colore (1978) and War of the Robots (1978), appearing in 16 films between 1974 and 1981. In the mid-1980s, she left show business and moved to Los Angeles, where she opened a downtown antiques shop and promoted volunteering.

References

External links 
 

1954 births
Living people
Actresses from Milan
Italian film actresses
Eritrean actresses
20th-century Italian actresses
Italian people of Eritrean descent